Line Dariel (1898–1956) was a Belgian-born French singer and actress.

Selected filmography
 Le mystère du 421 (1938)
 The Martyr of Bougival (1949)
 Emile the African (1949)

References

Bibliography
 Goble, Alan. The Complete Index to Literary Sources in Film. Walter de Gruyter, 1999.

External links

1898 births
1956 deaths
Belgian film actresses
20th-century Belgian women singers
20th-century Belgian singers
Actresses from Brussels
Belgian emigrants to France